U.S. Route 287 (US-287) is a north-south highway that starts at the Texas state line north of Kerrick, Texas, and ends at the Colorado state line south of Campo, Colorado.

Route description 

In Oklahoma, US-287 remains within Cimarron County, located at the end of the Panhandle. After crossing the state line north of Kerrick, Texas, the highway intersects State Highway 171 (SH-171) at its southern terminus. US-287 continues northwest, crossing the Beaver River, toward Boise City. On the east side of town, the highway crosses US-56, US-64, and US-412, and forms a concurrency with SH-3. These three highways head north to the Colorado state line. SH-3 ends there, while US-287 and US-385 continue onward into Colorado.

History 
On May 28, 2021 Oklahoma governor Kevin Stitt signed legislation designating a roughly 20-mile portion of U.S. 287 between Boise City and the Oklahoma-Texas border as the President Donald J. Trump Highway, effective as of November 1.

Junction list

References

External links 

87-2
 Oklahoma

Transportation in Cimarron County, Oklahoma